The Truth About Charlie is a 2002 mystery film. It is a remake of Charade (1963) and an homage to François Truffaut's Shoot the Piano Player (1960) complete with the French film star Charles Aznavour, making two appearances singing his song "Quand tu m'aimes" (first in French, later in English). The film was produced, directed and co-written by Jonathan Demme, and stars Mark Wahlberg and Thandiwe Newton in the roles played by Cary Grant and Audrey Hepburn in Charade.

This version closely mirrors the plotline of the original film. It is once again set in Paris and features several famous French actors. Director Agnès Varda made a cameo appearance. Actress/chanteuse Anna Karina sings a Serge Gainsbourg song in one scene. Peter Stone, screenwriter of Charade, receives a story credit as Peter Joshua, one of the aliases Grant's character uses in the first film. Stone disliked the remake and refused to be credited under his real name. The name of Wahlberg's character in the remake is Joshua Peters. The film was poorly received by critics and was a flop at the box office, earning only $7.1 million worldwide.

Plot

British newlywed Regina Lambert lives in Paris with her husband Charles.  She returns home following a short vacation, determined to divorce Charles only to discover their apartment has been stripped bare and that her husband has been murdered. The French police are in her apartment.  Charles had liquidated their possessions for $1.8M and the money is missing.    

Regina is soon reunited with a mysterious stranger Joshua (Mark Wahlberg) she met on her holiday. He helps her piece together the truth about the deceased Charlie and deal with three menacing people who are now following her.

Cast

 Mark Wahlberg as Lewis Bartholomew (alias Joshua Peters)
 Stephen Dillane as Charlie
 Thandiwe Newton as Regina Lambert (credited as Thandie Newton)
 Sakina Jaffrey as Sylvia
 Christine Boisson as Commandant Dominique
 Simon Abkarian as Lieutenant Dessalines
 Park Joong-hoon as Lee Il-sang
 Lisa Gay Hamilton as Lola Jansco
 Ted Levine as Emil Zadapec
 Magali Noël as Mysterious woman in black
 Tim Robbins as Carson J. Dyle  
 Agnès Varda as The widow Hyppolite
 Charles Aznavour as Charles Aznavour
 Olivier Broche as Aznavour fan
 Manno Charlemagne as 'Chez Josephine' Maitre D'
 Anna Karina as Karina
 Philippe Katerine as Karina fan
 Philippe Duquesne as Café cook
 Kenneth Utt as The Late Monsieur Hyppolite
 Sotigui Kouyaté as Dealer Prophète
 Paula Moore as Ms. Hoskins
 Françoise Bertin as Woman on Train
 Jason Ainley as Smash Loser
 David Barco as Smash Champion
 Mike Diamente as Smash Referee
 Alban Lenoir as Skinhead

Reception
The Truth About Charlie received negative reviews from critics. The film holds a 33% approval rating on Rotten Tomatoes, based on 135 reviews. The website's consensus reads, "Newton has star quality, but this exercise in style can't hold a candle to the original."

References

External links
Official website (archived)

2002 films
2000s crime thriller films
2000s comedy mystery films
2002 romantic comedy films
American crime thriller films
Remakes of American films
American comedy mystery films
American neo-noir films
French neo-noir films
2000s comedy thriller films
Films set in Paris
Films directed by Jonathan Demme
Films scored by Rachel Portman
French remakes of American films
Universal Pictures films
English-language French films
2000s American films
2000s French films